Wayna Q'inti (Quechua wayna young, q'inti hummingbird, Q'inti a place nearby, "young Q'inti", hispanicized and mixed spellings Huaynaquente, Waynaquente, also Wayna Q'ente) is an archaeological site in Peru. It is situated in the Cusco Region, Urubamba Province, Machupicchu District. Wayna Q'inti is situated above the left bank of the Willkanuta River, near the archaeological sites of Machu Q'inti (Quechua for old Q'inti), Willkaraqay and Patallaqta which is also named Q'inti Marka (Quechua for hummingbird village).

References 

Archaeological sites in Peru
Archaeological sites in Cusco Region